Bríd Ní Mhóráin (born 1951) is an Irish poet.

Biography

Ní Mhóráin was born in Newmarket, County Cork, and raised in west County Kerry. She taught languages in Tralee from 1975 to 2001.

Select works
 Ceiliúradh Cré, Coiscéim, 1992
 Fé Bhrat Bhríde, An Sagart, 2002
 Síolta an Iomais, Cló Iar-Chonnachta, 2006
 An Cosán Bán/The White Path, Oidhreacht Chorca Dhuibhne 2008

External links
 https://www.munsterlit.ie/Southword/Contributors/nimhorain_brid.html
 https://portraidi.ie/en/brid-ni-mhorain/
 https://www.poetryinternationalweb.net/pi/site/poet/item/22758/30/Brid-Ni-Mhorain
 https://web.archive.org/web/20180810205238/http://www.irishwriters-online.com/ni-mhorain-brid/

1951 births
Irish-language poets
Irish women poets
Living people
20th-century Irish people
21st-century Irish people
People from County Cork
People from County Kerry